The 1887 Ilkeston by-election was held on 24 March 1887 after the death of the incumbent Liberal MP Thomas Watson.  The election was won by the Liberal candidate, Sir Balthazar Walter Foster.

References 

By-elections to the Parliament of the United Kingdom in Derbyshire constituencies
Ilkeston
March 1887 events
1887 elections in the United Kingdom
1887 in England
19th century in Derbyshire